In chemistry, an arsaalkyne is chemical compound with a triple bond between carbon and arsenic.  These organoarsenic compounds are rare, especially in comparison with the phosphaalkynes.  The parent HCAs has been characterized spectroscopically, otherwise the only arsaalkynes have bulky organic substituents.

Synthesis and isolation
Arsaalkynes are produced by dehydrohalogenation or related base-induced elimination reactions. The case of HCAs is illustrative:

Owing to the principles of the double bond rule, arsaalkynes tend to oligomerize more readily than the phosphorus analogues.  Thus attempts to prepare AsCCMe3 produce the tetramer, which has a cubane structure.  The very bulky substituent C6H2-2,4,6-(t-Bu)3 does however allow the crystallization of the monomeric arsaalkyne.  Its As-C bond length is 1.657(7) Å.

References

Functional groups
Organoarsenic compounds